Sítio Maria Aparecida is a logging village deep in the Amazon Rainforest, Amazonas, Brazil. The BR-174 road runs through it; the nearest settlement is Sítio São Raimundo.

References 

Populated places in Amazonas (Brazilian state)